KSO may refer to:

Honours and titles
Commander of the Order of the Sword
Kommunstyrelseordförande, Swedish title for Municipal commissioner, equivalent to mayor
 Order of St. Olav, Norwegian honour

Orchestras
 Kalamazoo Symphony Orchestra, Michigan, United States 
 Kaohsiung Symphony Orchestra, Taiwan
 Kensington Symphony Orchestra, London, England
 Kristiansand Symphony Orchestra, Norway

Radio stations

 Call sign used from 1925 until 1935 by AM station KRNT, Des Moines, Iowa, United States
 Call sign used from 1935 until 1989 by AM staton KXNO (AM), Des Moines, Iowa, United States

Other
 Kanzelhoehe Solar Observatory, Austria 
 Aristoteles Airport, Kastoria, Greece
 Kingsoft Office, software suite
 A make of Vibram FiveFingers footwear 
 Keep Sydney Open, or The Open Party in Australia